Harold Dwayne Akin (January 11, 1945 – March 18, 2022) was an American football player.  An offensive tackle, he played college football at Oklahoma State University, and played professionally in the American Football League for the San Diego Chargers in 1967 and 1968. Akin later went on to found The Budget Floor Store in Oklahoma City, which now has 4 locations across Oklahoma.

See also
List of American Football League players

References

External links
NFL.com
databasefootball.com

1945 births
2022 deaths
Businesspeople from Oklahoma City
People from McAlester, Oklahoma
Players of American football from Oklahoma
American football offensive tackles
Oklahoma State Cowboys football players
San Diego Chargers players
American Football League players